Audrey I. Pheffer (born August 13, 1941) is an American Democratic Party politician from New York. She is currently serving as Queens County Clerk. Previously, she represented District 23 in the New York State Assembly from 1987–2011, which comprised Rockaway Beach, Howard Beach and Ozone Park, among other neighborhoods found within the New York City borough of Queens.

Early life
Pheffer worked from 1973 to 1977 at the Rockaway Occupational Training Center and agency of the Queens Association of ARC, where she worked with the developmentally disabled. In 1977, she was a member of the New York City Commission of Human Rights.

Despite her long separation from education and having only a high school diploma, she successfully combined being a working mom and a full-time student at Queens College, City University of New York, where she received a B.A. degree (cum laude) in 1982.

She was a Special Assistant to former New York City Council President Andrew Stein and Executive Assistant to State Senator Jeremy S. Weinstein.

Pheffer resides in Far Rockaway and has two children, Mitchell and Stacey. She and her life partner Glenn Riddell have six grandchildren.

Political career
On April 28, 1987, she elected to the New York State Assembly, to fill the vacancy caused by the resignation of Gerdi E. Lipschutz. Pheffer was re-elected many times, and remained in the Assembly until 2011, sitting in the 187th, 188th, 189th, 190th, 191st, 192nd, 193rd, 194th, 195th, 196th, 197th, 198th and 199th New York State Legislatures. She was Chairwoman of the Committee on Consumer Affairs and Protection from 1995 to 2011. In the past she has chaired the Assembly's Election Law Committee and the Subcommittee on Outreach and Oversight of Senior Citizen Programs, and served as President of the National Order of Women Legislators from 1995 to 1996.

In 2001 Pheffer launched a run for Queens Borough President before ultimately withdrawing from the race.

In 2011, she resigned from the State Assembly after being elected to the position of County Clerk of Queens County. She is ex officio a clerk of the New York Supreme Court and Commissioner of Jurors of Queens. In 2016, her daughter Stacey Pheffer Amato was elected to her mother's old Assembly seat, becoming the first such same-seat mother-daughter combination in the Assembly's history.

References

External links
Biography: New York State Democratic Committee
Conservative Party Goes Begging For Candidates
Weld In Rockaway; Local To Challenge Pheffer
Gotham Gazette's Eye On Albany: New York State Assembly: District 23
Democratic Field Is Narrowed For Queens Borough President

1941 births
Living people
Democratic Party members of the New York State Assembly
Jewish American state legislators in New York (state)
Public officeholders of Rockaway, Queens
Women state legislators in New York (state)
Queens College, City University of New York alumni
21st-century American politicians
21st-century American women politicians
20th-century American politicians
20th-century American women politicians
People from Far Rockaway, Queens
21st-century American Jews